Kuala is a town and administrative district of Langkat Regency in northern Sumatra, Indonesia. It borders Selesai to the north, Salapian to the west, and Sei Bingai to the south and east. Most people in Kuala are Javanese people, with a significant Karo population. Although most Karo are Christian, many are also Muslim, and as the Javanese are nearly 100% Muslim, Kuala subdistrict is 80% Muslim.

Kuala town itself had a population of 12,459 in 2010, making it by far the largest settlement in the district. It lies on the main road between Binjai and Bukit Lawang.

Agriculture
Agriculture in Kuala District is relatively homogenous, with 6,425 hectares of oil palm, 4,243 hectares of sawah (wet rice), 880 hectares of maize and 3,466 hectares of natural rubber, with little land devoted to other crops. There are five factories in the district.

References

Langkat Regency